Liptovské Kľačany is a village and municipality in Liptovský Mikuláš District in the Žilina Region of northern Slovakia.

History 
In historical records the village was first mentioned in 1474.

Geography 
The municipality lies at an altitude of 672 metres and covers an area of 13.412 km². It has a population of about 360 people.

External links 
 https://web.archive.org/web/20080111223415/http://www.statistics.sk/mosmis/eng/run.html

Villages and municipalities in Liptovský Mikuláš District